Best Concert: My Graduation is the 2nd concert DVD from Japanese pop singer Nami Tamaki. The DVD managed to become #8 on the Oricon Charts. It is so far the highest budgeted concert from Nami Tamaki, featuring a large screen, two stage levels, and professional dancers, as well as unique costumes.

Concert set-list
"OP. My Graduation"
"High School Queen"
"Realize"
"Sunrize"
"Promised Land"
"Shning Star: Wasurenai Kara"
"(Nami's Original Songs Medley) Be Positive: Dreamers/Identity"
"Heroine"
"You"
"Dance Interlude"
"Get Wild"
"Reason"
"(Medley) Fortune: My Way/Fortune"
"Heart and Soul: Daitan Ni Ikimashou"
"Sanctuary"
"Result"

Encore
"(Medley) Prayer: Programless Beat Mix I Can Fly"
"Cross Season"
"Believe"
"19 Growing Up: Ode to My Buddy"

2007 video albums
Nami Tamaki albums